Raiya Tunda is a gram panchayat in Taranagar sub district of Churu district in the Indian state of Rajasthan. The village has been chosen as Adarash Gram by jaynarayan poonia the member of parliament of Taranagar sub district. Raiya Tunda is 62 km away from its district headquarter Churu.

Transportation
Raiya Tunda is well connected by roads to its nearest cities Taranagar (36 km), Nohar (45 km), Bhadra (52 km) and Sardarshahar (60 km). The nearest railway station is Nohar. Raiya Tunda is about 350 km away from New Delhi. The nearest airport to Raiya Tunda is Bathinda (160 km).

Language and culture
The people of Raiya Tunda speak Bagri language and the Bagri culture is dominant here.

Education
There is one government senior high secondary school, two government primary school  and two private schools in the village. Most of the students of the village go to sahwa for study. Most of the old aged people are uneducated.

Economy
Most of the village economy based on farming. Indra Gandhi lift canal passes through the village. Most of the fields are irrigated, but sandy dunes can still be seen in the village.

References 

Villages in Churu district